Pope John XXIII High School was a private, Roman Catholic high school in Everett, Massachusetts, in the Roman Catholic Archdiocese of Boston.
The school was established in 1965.  It is an independent, coeducational, Catholic college preparatory school serving the metro Boston area. In 2016, Roncalli Prep, recognizing Pope John XXIII's name before taking John as his name ( Grade 8 ) was added to the student body. Roncalli Prep attracts Catholic students from the public school system seeking an advanced curriculum including STEM science, honors algebra, honors Spanish and the humanities.

Due to financial difficulties brought on by default by the United School Association (president Phil Morgaman of Florida), the school closed on May 31, 2019.

Academics

The curriculum at Pope John XXIII High School provides multiple pathways of academic function - College Preparatory, Honors and Advanced Placement.

Performing arts
Students produce drama, musicals, talent shows, and summer productions. Recent shows include Godspell, A Christmas Carol, Guys and Dolls, and Hello, Dolly!. Visits are made to shows at Boston theatres; the Drama Club saw the production of War Horse at the Boston Opera House.

In the fall of 2016, students performed a rendition "The Election."

Sports
Sports teams include:
Cheerleading
Football
Boys' Soccer
Girls' Soccer
Boys' Volleyball
Girls' Volleyball
Boys' Basketball
Girls' Basketball
Baseball
Softball
Girls' Tennis
Boys LAX

In 2016 the Pope John Tigers won the Catholic Central Small League after defeating second place, Matignon (Cambridge) 93–70 in Matignon's gym. The Tigers would go on to the MIAA Division 4 North Final, and there The Tigers would fall to St Mary's (Lynn) 68-49 (who would go on to win the Division 4 State Championship a week later) after defeating St Clement (Medford) in the Division 4 North Quarter Finals, 52–49 at Pope John and defeating defending state champion Hamilton-Wenham 50–38 in the Division 4 North Semi-Finals at Wilmington High School. The Tigers finished the 2016 season with a  20–3 record.  In 2018, the Tigers, on the strength of a 49-point performance by Angel Price Espada, would win the school's first State Championship in basketball. Pope John defeated the defending State Champion Maynard HS 89–57 at Springfield College. Seniors Mike Thompson, Marquis Bouyer and Juniors Mekhi Collins, and Luis Velasquez started the game for the Tigers. The 2018 Pope John Football team went undefeated in the Catholic Central (Small) League winning that championship. In the MIAA playoffs, Pope John won the Eastern Massachusetts Championship before falling to Saint Bernard Catholic High School in the Super Bowl played at Gillette Stadium.

Clubs and organizations

Adventure Club
Ambassador Club
Campus Ministry
Chess Club
Culinary Club
Drama Club/Theatre Arts Program
Girls Who Code
Math Club
Mock Trial
National Honor Society
Poetry Club
Running Club
School Newspaper: The Mercury
School Yearbook Club
Special Effects Club
Student Government
World Travel Club

Student life

Extracurricular activities include campus ministry, drama and Theatre Arts, the school newspaper The Mercury, the chess club, and student government.

Notes and references

External links
  School Website

Catholic secondary schools in Massachusetts
Schools in Middlesex County, Massachusetts
Educational institutions established in 1965
1965 establishments in Massachusetts